Flosmutisia is a genus of flowering plants in the family Asteraceae.

There is only one known species, Flosmutisia paramicola, endemic to the Magdalena region of northern Colombia.

References

Monotypic Asteraceae genera
Astereae
Endemic flora of Colombia